Mary Copeland may refer to:
Mary Fallin: An American politician
Mary Shawn Copeland: An American womanist and theologian